Raúl Castro (born 1931) is the former President of State Council of Cuba (2008–2018) and current First Secretary of the Communist Party of Cuba (2011-present).

Raúl Castro may also refer to:

 Raúl Héctor Castro (1916–2015), Mexican-American politician, Governor of Arizona (1974–1976), and US ambassador
 Raúl Castro (footballer) (born 1989), Bolivian footballer
 Raúl Castro Stagnaro, Peruvian politician, president of the Christian People's Party
 Raúl Castro Vera, Peruvian politician, president of the Workers' Revolutionary Party
 Raúl Castro (water polo), Uruguayan Olympic water polo player

See also
 Raúl Castronovo (born 1949), Argentine footballer